State Road 500 (SR 500) is a state highway running through Florida as a mostly unsigned route under several U.S. Highways.  From Chiefland to Williston it is U.S. Highway 27 Alternate (US 27 Alt.).  From Williston to Ocala, it is US 27.  From Ocala to Holopaw, it is US 441.  From Kissimmee to Indialantic it is US 192.

Names for State Road 500 include Young Boulevard, 100th Street, Hathaway Avenue, Noble Avenue, Blichton Road, 10th Street, Pine Street, Abshier Boulevard, North Boulevard, Main Street, Burleigh Boulevard, Orange Blossom Trail, East Irlo Bronson Memorial Highway, Space Coast Parkway, New Haven Avenue the Melbourne Causeway and Fifth Avenue.

Major intersections

Related route

State Road 500A (SR 500A) is a short signed state highway in Tavares, in Lake County, Florida, connecting US 441 (SR 500) with SR 19. Other alignments have existed, including Lake County's CR Old 441, CR 500A in Orange County, between SR 19 and US 441 through Tavares, Eustis and Mount Dora; and a former section of US 192 in eastern Osceola County. Old USGS maps show the abandoned section of the Kissimmee Highway between Lake X and Deer Park having been SR 500A at some point.

References

External links

Florida Route Log (SR 500)

500
500
500
500
500
500
500
500
500